Jack DeLeon (December 19, 1924 – October 16, 2006) was an American actor. He was best known for portraying Marty Morrison from 1975 to 1982 on the television detective sitcom Barney Miller, in a total of eight episodes.  His character was proudly and overtly homosexual, groundbreaking for network television at the time.  In the later episodes he was in a committed relationship with a male partner, which was respected by the detectives in the squad. He also was known for directing and appearing in segments of The Donny & Marie Show.

Between 1969 and 1990 he appeared on such network shows as Get Smart, That Girl, The Paul Lynde Show, CPO Sharkey, The Rookies, Starsky and Hutch, Sanford and Son, Switch, Too Close for Comfort, Archie Bunker’s Place, Laverne & Shirley, The Fall Guy, Night Court, Santa Barbara and Growing Pains. His film credits include Linda Lovelace for President (1975), I Wonder Who's Killing Her Now? (1975), The Choirboys (1977) and Little Miss Marker (1980). He voiced Sergeant Samuel McPherson in the 1977 Dr. Seuss animated television special Halloween Is Grinch Night. He was also the voice of Dwalin in the 1977 animated version of The Hobbit.

His interment was at Mount Sinai Memorial Park in Simi Valley, California.

Partial filmography
Linda Lovelace for President (1975) – Capt. Neldor
Kitty Can't Help It (1975) – MacGregor
Train Ride to Hollywood (1975) – News reporter
I Wonder Who's Killing Her Now? (1975) – Doctor Binay
The Hobbit (1977, TV Movie) – Dwalin / Fíli / Kíli / Óin / Glóin / Ori / Nori / Bifur / Bofur / Bert – Troll #2 / Goblin / Orc / Spiders / Wood Elves / Lake People (voice)
The Choirboys (1977) – Quigley
Little Miss Marker (1980) – Building Superintendent
Uphill All the Way (1986) – Sam Osmond 
Valet Girls (1987) – Dirk Zebra 
Violent Zone (1989) – Charles Townsend 
Life Stinks (1991) – Pompous Party Guest 
Temptress (1995) – Brian Carlin
Allyson Is Watching (1997) – Mr. Merry

References

External links

1924 births
2006 deaths
American male television actors
20th-century American male actors
American male film actors
Male actors from New York (state)